Miroljub Pešić (born 23 October 1993 in Belgrade) is a Serbian footballer who plays as a centre back for Mačva Šabac.

References

External links
 
 Pešić: Oberučke sam prihvatio poziv Stojića (VIDEO) at sportal.rs
 Građevinari u Antaliji at fkrad.rs
 Pešić, uzdanica Sinđelića at fkrad.rs
 Stats at Utakmica.rs

1993 births
Living people
Footballers from Belgrade
Serbian footballers
Association football defenders
FK Železnik players
FK Rad players
FK Sinđelić Beograd players
FK Mačva Šabac players
Serbian First League players
Serbian SuperLiga players